Cupid Shoot Me is the second album by Remi Nicole, released in the UK on 31 August. The album was produced by Grammy-winning producer Mark Taylor, who has worked with Rod Stewart, Tina Turner and Diana Ross, as well as Britney Spears, Kylie Minogue and Nelly Furtado.

The album is a mixture of styles ranging from doo wop to rockabilly, girl-group to soulful rock. Nicole describes it as an album about "not being in love", and says that "It’s like a fairy tale. There’s something quite enchanted about it.". She wrote all 11 songs on the album, and performed the vocals, guitar, keyboards, and drums for the record. The first single from the album will be Standing Tears Apart, released on 24 August.

Track listing
Cupid Shoot Me
In My Dreams
Nice Boy
Loveless
Another Day
Broke Hearted People
Standing Tears Apart
Come Find Me
Going It Alone
I'll Be Waiting
Love Me So
I Don't Know How
The rear sleeve of the album features the song titles linked together to form a summary of the story of the album: "CUPID SHOOT ME because IN MY DREAMS there was a NICE BOY who was LOVELESS. He told me that on ANOTHER DAY there would be many BROKEN HEARTED PEOPLE all STANDING TEARS APART. He said COME FIND ME, I’m fed up of GOING IT ALONE so I’LL BE WAITING for you to come and LOVE ME SO."

Singles

Standing Tears Apart – 24 August 2009 (Island)

References

2009 albums
Remi Nicole albums
Albums produced by Mark Taylor (music producer)